Diêu Trì station is one of the main railway stations on the North–South railway (Reunification Express) in Vietnam. It serves the town of Diêu Trì and connects by a branch line to Quy Nhon Railway Station and the city of Quy Nhon, ten kilometres to the east.

References

Railway stations in Vietnam
Buildings and structures in Bình Định province